Casabianca was the third and final member of the  of torpedo cruisers built for the French Navy in the 1890s. The class is also sometimes classified as torpedo gunboats or torpedo avisos.  The D'Iberville-class ships were a development of earlier torpedo cruisers, with the chief improvement being a significantly higher speed. Casabianca was armed with three  torpedo tubes and a single  gun as her primary offensive armament.

The ship served with the Mediterranean Squadron for the majority of her peacetime career, following her completion in 1896. During this time, her chief activities consisted of annual fleet maneuvers conducted every summer. She had been stationed as a guard ship in Tunis, French Tunisia in 1901, before returning to the Mediterranean Squadron by 1903. She was later converted into a minelayer in 1913, and served in this capacity during World War I. Casabianca accidentally struck one of her own mines during an operation off Smyrna on 3 June 1915, sinking with the loss of half of her crew. Sixty-six survivors were rescued by a nearby British destroyer.

Design

In the early 1880s, the French Navy began building a series of torpedo cruisers to make use of the new, self-propelled Whitehead torpedo. The three vessels of the D'Iberville class marked a return to larger vessels, with greatly increased speed compared to their predecessors. All of these ships have been alternatively called torpedo cruisers, torpedo gunboats, or torpedo avisos.

She displaced . Her crew varied from 140 to 143 officers and enlisted men over the course of her career. The ship's propulsion system consisted of a pair of triple-expansion steam engines driving two screw propellers. Steam was provided by eight coal-burning water-tube boilers that were ducted into two funnels.

The ship was armed with a main battery of one  gun in a pivot mount forward. For close-range defense against torpedo boats, she carried three  9-pounder quick-firing guns and six or seven  3-pounder Hotchkiss guns, all in individual mounts. She was also armed with three  torpedo tubes in her hull above the waterline.

Service history

The keel for Casabiana was laid down at the  shipyard in Lormont in January 1894, the last member of the class to begin construction. She was launched on 21 September 1895 and fitting-out work was completed in 1896. She was commissioned in time to take part in that year's maneuvers with the Mediterranean Squadron, which lasted from 6 to 30 July. She served as part of the cruiser screen for the 2nd Division, along with the armored cruiser , the protected cruiser , and the torpedo cruiser .

The ship remained with the cruiser screen for the Mediterranean Squadron in 1897, along with her sister ship  and several other vessels. She participated in the fleet maneuvers that year, which lasted from 7 to 30 July, and included night maneuvers, fleet defense against torpedo boats, and simulated battle between squadrons of battleships. Casabianca had one of her torpedo tubes removed in 1899. By 1901, the ship was reduced to the Reserve Division, and was stationed as a guard ship in Tunis. She participated in the 1902 fleet maneuvers, which occurred in three phases, though Casabianca was only involved in the last stage. This set of maneuvers lasted from 28 July to 4 August, and Casabianca was assigned to the main French fleet, tasked with defeating a simulated enemy fleet that represented the British Mediterranean Fleet.

She was transferred back to the Mediterranean Squadron in 1903. By that time, the ship lay at Toulon, awaiting repairs to her boilers, along with two dozen other major warships with similarly troublesome boilers. The ship was converted into a minelayer in 1913. She had a capacity of 97 naval mines. From the start of the conflict through mid-1915, Casabianca patrolled the Strait of Otranto and off Corfu at the southern end of the Adriatic Sea. The ship struck a naval mine she had laid herself off Smyrna and sank on 3 June during operations against the Ottoman Empire. Out of a complement of 128 men, 66 were rescued by a British destroyer, including the ship's captain.

Notes

References
 
 
 
 
 
 
 
 
 
 
 
 
 
 
 
 

D'Iberville-class cruisers
Ships built in France
1895 ships